The phrase "when pigs fly" (alternatively, "pigs might fly") is an adynaton—a figure of speech so hyperbolic that it describes an impossibility. The implication of such a phrase is that the circumstances in question (the adynaton, and the circumstances to which the adynaton is being applied) will never occur. The phrase has been used in various forms since the 1600s as a sarcastic remark.

Meaning

"When pigs fly" is an adynaton, a way of saying that something will never happen. The phrase is often used for humorous effect, to scoff at over-ambition. There are numerous variations on the theme; when an individual with a reputation for failure finally succeeds, onlookers may sarcastically claim to see a flying pig. ("Hey look! A flying pig!") Other variations on the phrase include "And pigs will fly", this one in retort to an outlandish statement.

An example occurs in the film The Eagle Has Landed: an Irish secret agent working for the Nazis replies to a German general speaking of Germany's shortly winning World War II, "Pigs may fly, General, but I doubt it!" Later, when the Irishman sees German soldiers parachuting before an attack, he says to himself, "Mother of God! Flying pigs!"

An identical phrase, used to express impossibilities, exists in Romanian, Când o zbura porcul, literally meaning "When the pig shall fly"; an equivalent also implying an animal is La Paștele cailor, literally: "on horses' Easter". Similar phrases in English include "when hell freezes over", the Latin expression "to the Greek calends", and "and monkeys might fly out of my butt", popularized in Wayne's World skits and movies. The German "Wenn Schweine fliegen können!" is identical with the English saying , although the older proverb "Wenn Schweine Flügel hätten, wäre alles möglich" ("if pigs had wings, everything would be possible") is in more common use. They are examples of adynata. In Finnish, the expression "kun lehmät lentävät" (when cows fly) is used because of its alliteration. In French, the most common expression is "quand les poules auront des dents" (when hens will have teeth). In Russian, a popular expression with a similar meaning is "когда рак на горе свистнет" (when the crayfish will whistle on the mountain). In medieval Hebrew manuscripts, the expression "until the donkey ascends the ladder" is attested.

The idiom is apparently derived from a centuries-old Scottish proverb, though some other references to pigs flying or pigs with wings are more famous. In his Fourth Book of Gargantua and Pantagruel from 1552, François Rabelais makes the aphorism into a dramatic event, when the giant Pantagruel fights the Chitterlings and its champion, "a huge, fat, thick, grizzly swine, with long and large wings, like those of a windmill."

At least one appears in the works of Lewis Carroll:

American literature author John Steinbeck was told by his professor that he would be an author when pigs flew. When he eventually became a novelist, he started to print every book he wrote with the insignia "Ad astra per alas porci" (to the stars on the wings of a pig). He sometimes added an image of a flying pig, called "Pigasus".

Pigasus was a flying pig character in the Oz books written by Ruth Plumly Thompson in the 1930s.

History
The first known use of the phrase "when pigs fly" comes from English lexicographer John Withals, who wrote A Shorte Dictionarie for Yonge Begynners, a Latin-English dictionary from 1616. Withal wrote "pigs fly in the ayre with their tayles forward", implying the impossibility not only of the flight of pigs but also backwards flight. Other uses of the phrase in famous literature include the aforementioned Alice's Adventures in Wonderland. Since 1616, the phrase has been used to denote impossibility.

References

External links

 Humorous Internet memorandum RFC 1925 insists that "with sufficient thrust, pigs fly just fine".

English-language idioms
Metaphors referring to pigs
Pigs in popular culture
Figures of speech